Loch Lomond is an American indie folk band based in Portland, Oregon, founded as a solo recording project of Ritchie Young in 2003.

History
Regarding the origins of the band name, Ritchie Young stated "I wanted to call the band The Mountains but there are tons of "mountains" bands. We ordered some reel-to-reel tape on eBay and it had a sticker on the box that said Loch Lomond. On the tape itself were old French nuns singing. We sampled that in our first record."

With help of engineer/producer Rob Oberdorfer, Young crafted the first Loch Lomond album, When We Were Mountains with Ryan Cross and Kate O'Brien in 2004. Over the next few years, Loch Lomond performed around Portland, Oregon and the greater Pacific Northwest in various incarnations. Live performances would range from Young by himself to a full band. During this time, many different recording sessions took place in various studios and homes. These recordings were compiled on the early 2006 EP Lament For Children. In the later half of 2006, Loch Lomond solidified into a nine-person band. In this format, they produced their 2007 album "Paper the Walls", which was more reminiscent of traditional chamber folk music while featuring many non-traditional instruments. They toured with The Decemberists in late 2008. In 2010, Loch Lomond's song, Wax and Wire, was featured in the short film Danny MacAskill's Way Back Home produced by Red Bull Media House.

2011 saw the release of Little Me Will Start A Storm, Tender Loving Empire. 2012 Chemikal Underground released the EP White Dresses.

Pens From Spain was released on September 2, 2016, on Hush Records.

Discography

Albums
 When We Were Mountains, 2004
 Paper The Walls, Hush Records, 2007
 Little Me Will Start A Storm, Tender Loving Empire, 2011
 Dresses, Chemikal Underground, 2013
 Pens From Spain, Hush Records, 2016
 The Young, Hush Records, 2022

EPs
 Lament for Children EP, Hush Records, 2006
 Trumpets For Paper Children EP, 2009 (Released as free internet download)
 Night Bats EP, Hush Records, 2009
 White Dresses EP, Chemikal Underground 2012

Singles
  "A String", 2015
 "Blue Lead Fences", 2009
 "Wax and Wire", 2011

Soundtrack
 Little Boxes, The Boxtrolls, 2014

References

External links
Loch Lomond profile on Myspace

Folktronica musicians
Musical groups from Portland, Oregon
2003 establishments in Oregon
Musical groups established in 2003
Chemikal Underground artists